The Mehr News Agency (MNA) is a semi-official news agency of the Iranian government. It is headquartered in Tehran, and is owned by the Islamic Ideology Dissemination Organization (IIDO).

History and profile
Established on 22 June 2003, MNA is the most multilingual (transmitting news and photos in six languages) news agency in the Islamic Republic of Iran and its first CEO and Director General was Parviz Esmaeili and its current CEO and Director General is Mohammad Shojaeian (since September 2019).

MNA includes coverage in the following areas:
 Art (cinema, theater, music, visual arts)
 Culture and literature (poetry, stories, books)
 Religion and thought
 Seminary and university
 Modern Technology
 Social
 Economy
 Political
 International
 Sports
 Magazines
 Photos
 Provinces

MNA has five regional centers inside the country—northern, southern, central, eastern, and western Iran.

It has also stringers and correspondents in Europe, South America, Turkey, East Asia, and some Persian Gulf littoral states and CIS countries for the time–being and is extending them across the world.

It transmits news and photos in six languages of Persian, English, Arabic, Turkish, Urdu and Kurdish.

Employing more than 300 reporters and photographers dispatched in 30 provinces of the country, MNA provides the widest news coverage in Iran.

International cooperation
The news agency was accepted as the 40th member of the Organization of Asia-Pacific News Agencies (OANA) at the 13th General Assembly held in Jakarta, Indonesia, in 2007. The agency was the host agency of the OANA 31st Executive Board Meeting (EBM) and the 25th Editorial-Technical Experts Group (ETEG) Meeting in 2009. It had also actively participated in two international summits – the 2009 World Media Summit in Beijing, China, and the 2010 OANA Summit Congress in Seoul, South Korea.

The agency was also a special guest of the III News Agencies’ World Congress (NAWC) in Argentina from 19 to 23 October 2010.

MNA also actively participated in the Istanbul OANA General Assembly  in November 2010 and the OANA 26th ETEG - 32nd EBM meetings in Ulan Bator in June 2011.

According to the OANA Secretary's report to the Istanbul Assembly, MNA, which has become OANA member since 2007, ranked second among the OANA member agencies in number of news and photos published on the organization's website. MNA initiated the OANA flag, and the 50-year-old OANA adopted the flag.

MNA has so far signed contracts with more than 20 foreign news agencies including the Japanese Kyodo News Agency, the Spanish EFE, the Chinese Xinhua, Cuba's official Prensa Latina (PL), the Press Trust of India (PTI), Korea's YONHAP, the Vietnam News Agency (VNA), the Turkish Cihan News Agency and Turkish Weekly, Georgia's PVNA, Zimbabwe's New Ziana, Romania's AGERPRES, Malaysia's BERNAMA, Indonesia's ANTARA, the Azerbaijani Trend News Agency, Mongolia's MONTSAME, the Syrian Arab News Agency (SANA), the Associated Press of Pakistan (APP), the Philippines News Agency (PNA) and Russian Sputnik news Agency.

Criticism
The news agency was criticized by the Anti-Defamation League as a "megaphone for notorious Holocaust deniers" as they interview with known Holocaust denier Robert Faurisson.

See also

 List of Iranian news agencies
 Media of Iran

References

External links

IOS Application

Government of the Islamic Republic of Iran
News agencies based in Iran
Iranian news websites
Organizations established in 2003
2003 establishments in Iran
Mass media in Tehran
Creative Commons-licensed websites
Photo agencies